Nymphaea is a genus of hardy and tender aquatic plants in the family Nymphaeaceae. The genus has a cosmopolitan distribution. Many species are cultivated as ornamental plants, and many cultivars have been bred. Some taxa occur as introduced species where they are not native, and some are weeds. Plants of the genus are known commonly as water lilies, or waterlilies in the United Kingdom. The genus name is from the Greek νυμφαία, nymphaia and the Latin nymphaea, which mean "water lily" and were inspired by the nymphs of Greek and Latin mythology.

Description

Water lilies are aquatic rhizomatous herbaceous perennials, sometimes with stolons as well. The stem is angular and erect.
The leaves grow from the rhizome on long petioles (stalk that attaches the leaf blade to the stem). Most of them float on the surface of the water. The leaves have smooth or spine-toothed edges, and they can be rounded or pointed.

The flowers rise out of the water or float on the surface, opening during the day or at night. Many species of Nymphaea display protogynous flowering. The temporal separation of these female and male phases is physically reinforced by flower opening and closing, so the first flower opening displays female pistil and then closes at the end of the female phase, and reopens with male stamens. Each has at least eight petals in shades of white, pink, blue, or yellow. Many stamens are at the center. Water lily flowers are entomophilous, meaning they are pollinated by insects, often beetles. The fruit is berry-like and borne on a curving or coiling peduncle.
The plant reproduces by root tubers and seeds.

Taxonomy 

This is one of several genera of plants known commonly as lotuses. It is not related to the legume genus Lotus or the East Asian and South Asian lotuses of genus Nelumbo. It is closely related to Nuphar lotuses, however. In Nymphaea, the petals are much larger than the sepals, whereas in Nuphar, the petals are much smaller. The process of fruit maturation also differs, with Nymphaea fruit sinking below the water level immediately after the flower closes, and Nuphar fruit remaining above the surface.

Subgenera 

 Anecphya
 Brachyceras
 Hydrocallis
 Lotos
 Nymphaea:
 section Chamaenymphaea
 section Nymphaea
 section Xanthantha

Species 
As accepted by Plants of the World Online;

 Nymphaea abhayana 
 Nymphaea alba  – white water lily 
 Nymphaea alexii 
 Nymphaea amazonum  – Amazon water lily
 Nymphaea ampla  – dotleaf water lily
 Nymphaea atrans 
 Nymphaea belophylla 
 Nymphaea × borealis 
 Nymphaea candida 
 Nymphaea carpentariae 
 Nymphaea conardii  – roundleaf water lily
 Nymphaea × daubenyana 
 Nymphaea dimorpha 
 Nymphaea divaricata 
 Nymphaea elegans  – tropical royalblue water lily
 Nymphaea elleniae 
 Nymphaea gardneriana 
 Nymphaea georginae 
 Nymphaea gigantea  – giant water lily
 Nymphaea glandulifera  – sleeping beauty water lily
 Nymphaea gracilis 
 Nymphaea guineensis 
 Nymphaea hastifolia 
 Nymphaea heudelotii 
 Nymphaea immutabilis 
 Nymphaea jacobsii 
 Nymphaea jamesoniana  – James' water lily
 Nymphaea kimberleyensis 
 Nymphaea lasiophylla 
 Nymphaea leibergii  – Leiberg's water lily
 Nymphaea lingulata 
 Nymphaea loriana 
 Nymphaea lotus  – Egyptian white water lily
 Nymphaea lukei 
 Nymphaea macrosperma 
 Nymphaea maculata 
 Nymphaea malabarica 
 Nymphaea manipurensis 
 Nymphaea mexicana  – yellow water lily
 Nymphaea micrantha 
 Nymphaea noelae 
 Nymphaea nouchali  – blue lotus
 Nymphaea novogranatensis 
 Nymphaea odorata  – fragrant water lily
 Nymphaea ondinea 
 Nymphaea oxypetala 
 Nymphaea potamophila 
 Nymphaea prolifera 
 Nymphaea pubescens  – hairy water lily
 Nymphaea pulchella 
 Nymphaea × rosea 
 Nymphaea rubra  – India red water lily
 Nymphaea rudgeana 
 Nymphaea siamensis 
 Nymphaea stuhlmannii 
 Nymphaea sulphurea 
 Nymphaea × sundvikii 
 Nymphaea tenuinervia 
 Nymphaea tetragona  – pygmy water lily
 Nymphaea thermarum 
 Nymphaea × thiona 
 Nymphaea vanildae 
 Nymphaea vaporalis 
 Nymphaea violacea 

Note; Nymphaea caerulea – blue Egyptian lotus - synonym of Nymphaea nouchali var. caerulea.

Cultivation 
Water lilies are not only decorative, but also provide useful shade which helps reduce the growth of algae in ponds and lakes. Many of the water lilies familiar in water gardening are hybrids and cultivars. These cultivars have gained the Royal Horticultural Society's Award of Garden Merit:

 'Escarboucle' (orange-red)
 'Gladstoniana' (double white flowers with prominent yellow stamens)
 'Gonnère' (double white scented flowers)
 'James Brydon;' (cupped rose-red flowers)
 'Marliacea Chromatella' (pale yellow flowers)
 'Pygmaea Helvola' (miniature, with cupped fragrant yellow flowers)

Uses

All water lilies are poisonous and contain an alkaloid called nupharin in almost all of their parts, with the exception of the seeds and in some species, the tubers.

The European species contain large amounts of nupharin, and are considered inedible. The amount of nupharin in the leaves and stalks appears to vary seasonally in European species.

In some species, the rhizomes and tubers are eaten after boiling has neutralised the nupharin.

The tubers of a number of Australian, Asian and African species are completely edible, during the dry season some consist almost entirely of starch.

The Ancient Egyptians ate them boiled.

In India, it has mostly been eaten as a famine food or as a medicinal (both cooked), but in one area the dried rhizomes were pounded into a sort of bread, and the tubers are often eaten in the floodplains.

In Vietnam, the rhizomes were eaten roasted.

In Sri Lanka it was formerly eaten as a type of medicine and its price was too high to serve as a normal meal, but in the 1940s or earlier some villagers began to grow water lilies in the paddy fields left uncultivated during the monsoon season (Yala season), and the price dropped. The tubers are called manel here and eaten boiled and in curries.

The tubers of all occurring species were eaten in West Africa and Madagascar (where they are called tantamon for blue and laze-laze for white), usually boiled or roasted.

In West Africa, usage varied between cultures, in the Upper Guinea the rhizomes were only considered famine foods - here the tubers were either roasted in ashes, or dried and ground into a flour. The Buduma people ate the seeds and rhizomes. Some tribes ate the rhizomes raw. 
The Hausa people of Ghana, Nigeria and the people of Southern Sudan used the tubers of Nymphaea lotus, the seeds (inside the tubers) are locally referred to as ‘gunsi’ in Ghana. They are ground into flour.

In China the tubers were eaten cooked.

The plants were also said to be eaten in the Philippines. In the 1950s there were no records of leaves or flowers being eaten.

In a North American species, the boiled young leaves and unopened flower buds are said to be edible. The seeds, high in starch, protein, and oil, may be popped, parched, or ground into flour. Potato-like tubers can be collected from the species N. tuberosa (=N. odorata).

The tubers of Nymphaea gigantea of Australia were roasted by certain tribes, these turn the colour blue when boiled, the tubers of other species were also roasted elsewhere on that continent.

Water lilies were said to have been a major food source for a certain tribe of indigenous Australians in 1930, with the flowers and stems eaten raw, while the "roots and seedpods" were cooked either on an open fire or in a ground oven.

Culture

The Ancient Egyptians used the water lilies of the Nile as cultural symbols. Since 1580 it has become popular in the English language to apply the Latin word lotus, originally used to designate a tree, to the water lilies growing in Egypt, and much later the word was used to translate words in Indian texts. The lotus motif is a frequent feature of temple column architecture.
In Egypt, the lotus, rising from the bottom mud to unfold its petals to the sun, suggested the glory of the sun's own emergence from the primaeval slime. It was a metaphor of creation. It was a symbol of the fertility gods and goddesses as well as a symbol of the upper Nile as the giver of life.

The flowers of the blue Egyptian water lily (N. caerulea) open in the morning and close at dusk, while those of the white water lily (N. lotus) open at night and close in the morning. Egyptians found this symbolic of the separation of deities and of death and the afterlife. Remains of both flowers have been found in the burial tomb of Ramesses II.

A Roman belief existed that drinking a liquid of crushed Nymphaea in vinegar for 10 consecutive days turned a boy into a eunuch.

The Nymphaea, which is also called (Nilufar in Persian), can be seen in many reliefs of the Achaemenid period (552 BC) such as the statue of Anahita in the Persepolis. Lotus flower was included in Kaveh the blacksmith's Derafsh and later as the flag of the Sasanian Empire Derafsh Kaviani. Today, it is known as the symbol of Iranians Solar Hijri Calendar.

A Syrian terra-cotta plaque from the 14th–13th centuries BC shows the goddess Asherah holding two lotus blossoms. An ivory panel from the 9th-8th centuries BC shows the god Horus seated on a lotus blossom, flanked by two cherubs.

There is a Polish poem by 19th-century poet Juliusz Słowacki in which the rhizomes are eaten.

The French Impressionist painter Claude Monet is known for his many paintings of water lilies in the pond in his garden at Giverny.

N. nouchali is the national flower of Bangladesh and Sri Lanka.

Water lilies are also used as ritual narcotics. According to one source, this topic "was the subject of a lecture by William Emboden given at Nash Hall of the Harvard Botanical Museum on the morning of April 6, 1979".

Examples

See also
 Albert de Lestang, propagator and seed collector
 List of plants known as lily

References

External links

 Knotts, K. The first hybrid waterlilies. 
 GRIN Species Records of Nymphaea.

Further reading
 Slocum, P. D. Waterlilies and Lotuses. Timber Press. 2005.  (restricted online version at Google Books)

 
Nymphaeales genera
Freshwater plants
Medicinal plants